Neamț may refer to the following places in Romania:

Neamț County, an administrative division
Neamț Mountains
Neamț Citadel, a fortress near Târgu Neamț, Neamț County
Piatra Neamț, the capital city of Neamț County
Târgu Neamț, a town in Neamț County
Neamț Monastery, a monastery near Târgu Neamț
 Neamț (Moldova), also Ozana, a tributary of the Moldova in Neamț County
 Neamț, a tributary of the Mraconia in Mehedinți County
 Neamțu, a tributary of the Nemțișor in Neamț County

See also
Németh